Hackneyville is a census-designated place and unincorporated community in Tallapoosa County, Alabama, United States. Its population was 347 as of the 2010 census.

Demographics

History
Hackneyville was named after Hackney, a suburb of London, England.

References

Census-designated places in Tallapoosa County, Alabama
Census-designated places in Alabama